Art & Survival is an album by the American vocal jazz singer Dianne Reeves, released in 1994.

The album peaked at No. 19 on the Billboard Jazz Albums chart. It has sold more than 500,000 copies.

Production
The album was produced by Eddie del Barrio and Terri Lyne Carrington. Reeves cowrote more than half the songs on Art & Survival.

Critical reception

The Los Angeles Times thought that "this multitextured experiment, with its frequent spiritual-based stories, is Reeves' most ambitious effort." The Washington Post wrote: "By far her most personal and soul-searching recording, the album seems as much therapy as a musical expression for the gifted singer." The Philadelphia Daily News stated: "In an incantational style sometimes reminiscent of Leon Thomas and Roberta Flack, the singer/composer evokes ancient spirits and the freeing powers of the Lord, explaining how she's come through the wringer a changed woman."

Newsday deemed the album "a song cycle about self-discovery." Essence called it an "album of powerfully rendered, personal yet universal compositions that run the rhythmic gamut from hard-swinging jazz to plaintive ballads to a cappella African chants." USA Today wrote that "Body and Soul" is "a scat-driven, Afro-Cuban tour de force." 

AllMusic considered the album "neither '90s revisited bop nor overtly commercial Quiet Storm fodder ... [Reeves] is really seeking a middle ground between her two audiences."

Track listing

References

Dianne Reeves albums
1994 albums
EMI Records albums